Laura Worley Fornash (born August 26, 1969) is a former Virginia Secretary of Education, serving from 2011 to 2013 under Governor Bob McDonnell. Previously working as Virginia Tech's director of state government relations, she was appointed Deputy Secretary of Education in 2010 and was elevated to secretary upon the resignation of Gerard Robinson. She left in 2013 to take a position with the University of Virginia.

References

External links
 Virginia Secretary of Education

Living people
1969 births
State cabinet secretaries of Virginia
Virginia Tech alumni
Women in Virginia politics
McGuireWoods people
21st-century American women